The Living Word Fellowship is a Christian cult that at various times was located in the United States, Canada, Brazil, and Mexico.

The group was founded in South Gate, California, by John Robert Stevens in 1951. The fellowship celebrated the Jewish Old Testament festivals, and "It believes in the inerrancy of the Scripture, in the Trinity, in Christ's saving work, and in the various gifts and ministries of the Spirit as taught by the apostle Paul."

At its peak in the 1970s, the fellowship had about 100 member congregations. Its oversight was centered at Shiloh, a farm and retreat site near Kalona, Iowa. Membership declined after founder Stevens' death in 1983 and the fellowship continued to close churches throughout the 1990s. As of early 2018, it comprised around ten primary churches.

The Living Word Fellowship announced in late November 2018 that, in the wake of sexual misconduct allegations, it was closing down the organization and its central governing body.

In November, 2018, Gary Hargrave announced his resignation as head of the organization, following a sexual misconduct scandal taking place within the branches of the Living Word Fellowship. He has since founded a new organization known as Hargrave Ministries

In a December 21, 2018 press release, Shiloh announced the end of its affiliation with The Living Word Fellowship. Shiloh, which served as the headquarters of the fellowship since the 1970s, is currently in discussion with the city of Kalona about a possible annexation of the more than 200 acres of church property south of the city limits.

As of August, 2020, five women have filed lawsuits against the Living Word Fellowship. The lawsuits claim that Living Word employees and officials sexually abused these women when they were minors.

In Oct 2020, the former Shiloh Facilities were burned to the ground by the Kalona Volunteer Fire Department. This was done as a practice burn.

Notable members 
Anthony Cox (producer)
 Rick Holbrook, recording engineer

References

External links
John Robert Stevens Official website
 Let's Talk About Sects
 

Christian new religious movements
Christian organizations established in 1951
1951 establishments in California
Cults